The pink surfperch (Zalembius rosaceus),  or pink seaperch, is a species of surfperch native to the eastern Pacific Ocean from Point Delgada, California, United States to southern Baja California. It is also present in the Gulf of California. The Pink surfperch grows to a length of  TL. It is the only known member of its genus.

References

Embiotocidae
Fish described in 1880
Taxa named by David Starr Jordan
Taxa named by Charles Henry Gilbert